Kirsten Dunst is an American actress who has received numerous accolades, including a Cannes Film Festival Award, a Screen Actors Guild Award, a Critics' Choice Television Award,  three Satellite Awards, and two Saturn Awards, in addition to various other nominations.

A child actor, Dunst first came to critical notice for her portrayal of Claudia in Interview with the Vampire (1994), which, at age 12, earned her a Golden Globe nomination for Best Supporting Actress, as well as accolades from the Chicago and Boston Societies of Film Critics. She gained further accolades for her role in Little Women, released the same year, including a Best Supporting Actress win from the Boston Society of Film Critics. Dunst went on to appear in a variety of teen films throughout the late 1990s, and garnered a mainstream resurgence for her role as Mary Jane Watson in Spider-Man (2002), as well as its second and third sequels.

In 2011, Dunst received critical acclaim for her performance as a depressed newlywed in Lars von Trier's science fiction drama Melancholia, winning the Cannes Film Festival Award for Best Actress, as well as a Sant Jordi Award and Robert Award; she also received an AACTA nomination, and multiple awards from various international critics' associations. Dunst received further critical recognition for her portrayal of Peggy Blumquist on the network series Fargo in 2015, winning the Satellite Award for Best Actress, as well as nominations for the Primetime Emmy Award for Outstanding Lead Actress in a Limited Series or Movie, and the Golden Globe for Best Actress – Miniseries or Television Film. The following year, she won a Screen Actors Guild Award for Best Ensemble as part of the cast in the biographical drama Hidden Figures.

In 2021, Dunst received critical acclaim for her performance in The Power of the Dog, for which she was nominated for the Golden Globe Award, SAG Award, and the Academy Award for Best Supporting Actress, among other numerous awards.

Major associations

Academy Awards
The Academy Awards, commonly known as the "Oscars", are a set of awards given by the Academy of Motion Picture Arts and Sciences annually for excellence of cinematic achievements.

Cannes Film Festival
Cannes Film Festival, is an annual film festival held in Cannes, France, which previews new films of all genres, including documentaries, from all around the world.

Golden Globe Awards
The Golden Globe Award is an accolade bestowed by the 93 members of the Hollywood Foreign Press Association (HFPA) recognizing excellence in film and television, both domestic and foreign.

Primetime Emmy Awards
The Primetime Emmy Awards are presented annually by the Academy of Television Arts & Sciences, also known as the Television Academy, to recognize and honor achievements in the television industry.

Screen Actors Guild Awards
The Screen Actors Guild Awards are organized by the Screen Actors Guild‐American Federation of Television and Radio Artists. First awarded in 1995, the awards aim to recognize excellent achievements in film and television.

Miscellaneous awards

AACTA International Awards
The Australian Academy of Cinema and Television Arts Awards are presented annually by the Australian Academy of Cinema and Television Arts (AACTA) to recognize and honor achievements in the film and television industry.

Blockbuster Entertainment Awards

Bodil Awards
The Bodil Awards are the major Danish film awards presented annually by Danish Film Critics Association. Established in 1948, it is one of the oldest film awards in Europe.

Critics' Choice Movie Awards 
The Critics' Choice Movie Awards are presented annually since 1995 by the Broadcast Film Critics Association for outstanding achievements in the cinema industry.

Critics' Choice Television Awards
The Critics' Choice Television Awards are presented annually since 2011 by the Broadcast Television Journalists Association. The awards were launched "to enhance access for broadcast journalists covering the television industry".

Empire Awards
The Empire Awards is a British awards ceremony held annually to recognize cinematic achievements.

European Film Awards
The European Film Awards have been presented annually since 1988 by the European Film Academy to recognize excellence in European cinematic achievements.

Kids' Choice Awards
The Nickelodeon Kids' Choice Awards is an annual American children's awards ceremony show established in 1988 by Nickelodeon, with winners chosen by public vote.

Mar del Plata Film Festival
The Mar del Plata International Film Festival is held annually in Mar del Plata, Argentina, organized by the National Institute of Cinema and Audiovisual Arts (INCAA).

MTV Movie Awards
The MTV Movie Awards is an annual award show presented by MTV to honor outstanding achievements in films. Founded in 1992, the winners of the awards are decided online by the audience.

People's Choice Awards
The People's Choice Awards is an American awards show recognizing the people and the work of popular culture. The show has been held annually since 1975, and is voted on by the general public.

Robert Awards
The Robert Awards are held annually in Denmark by the Danish Film Academy, honoring achievements in film.

Sant Jordi Awards
The Sant Jordi Awards are film prizes awarded annually in Barcelona by the Catalonia region of the Spanish radio network Radio Nacional de España.

Satellite Awards
The Satellite Awards are a set of annual awards given by the International Press Academy.

Saturn Awards
The Saturn Awards are presented annually by the Academy of Science Fiction, Fantasy, and Horror Films to honor science fiction, fantasy, and horror films, television, and home video.

Teen Choice Awards
The Teen Choice Awards is an annual awards show that airs on the Fox Network. The awards honor the year's biggest achievements in music, movies, sports, television, fashion, and other categories, voted by teen viewers.

Young Artist Awards
The Young Artist Award is an accolade presented by the Young Artist Association, a non-profit organization founded in 1978 to honor excellence of youth performers, and to provide scholarships for young artists who may be physically disabled or financially unstable.

YoungStar Awards
The YoungStar Awards were presented annually between 1995 and 2000 by The Hollywood Reporter, honoring young American actors and actresses from ages 6–18 in their work in film, television, stage and music.

Critics associations

Notes

References

Lists of awards received by American actor